Yaldhurst is a semi-rural suburb on the western outskirts of Christchurch city. Frederick William Delamain (1835–1910), a settler and horse breeder, named a horse Yaldhurst after some stables in England. The area was named after the horse.

The Yaldhurst Museum is a private museum specialising in displays of land vehicles and technology.

Yaldhurst electorate extended over a larger rural area west of Christchurch from 1978 to 1996.

Demographics

Yaldhurst had a population of 1,602 at the 2018 New Zealand census, an increase of 168 people (11.7%) since the 2013 census, and an increase of 888 people (124.4%) since the 2006 census. There were 552 households. There were 804 males and 798 females, giving a sex ratio of 1.01 males per female. The median age was 39.2 years (compared with 37.4 years nationally), with 261 people (16.3%) aged under 15 years, 345 (21.5%) aged 15 to 29, 777 (48.5%) aged 30 to 64, and 219 (13.7%) aged 65 or older.

Ethnicities were 76.4% European/Pākehā, 5.8% Māori, 1.9% Pacific peoples, 18.2% Asian, and 3.6% other ethnicities (totals add to more than 100% since people could identify with multiple ethnicities).

The proportion of people born overseas was 26.2%, compared with 27.1% nationally.

Although some people objected to giving their religion, 47.0% had no religion, 41.4% were Christian, 1.3% were Hindu, 1.7% were Muslim, 1.3% were Buddhist and 1.5% had other religions.

Of those at least 15 years old, 288 (21.5%) people had a bachelor or higher degree, and 192 (14.3%) people had no formal qualifications. The median income was $39,600, compared with $31,800 nationally. The employment status of those at least 15 was that 756 (56.4%) people were employed full-time, 198 (14.8%) were part-time, and 39 (2.9%) were unemployed.

Education
Yaldhurst Model School is a full primary school catering for years 1 to 8.

References

Suburbs of Christchurch
Populated places in Canterbury, New Zealand